was a short-lived province located in Hokkaidō.  It corresponded to modern-day Sōya Subprefecture and Abashiri Subprefecture minus part of Abashiri District.

History
After 1869, the northern Japanese island was known as Hokkaido; and regional administrative subdivisions were identified, including Kitami Province.
August 15, 1869 Kitami Province established with 8 districts
1872 Census finds a population of 1,511
 July 1881 Abashiri District (網尻郡) incorporated for Abashiri District (網走郡) from Kushiro Province
1882 Provinces dissolved in Hokkaidō

Districts
Sōya (宗谷郡)
Rishiri (利尻郡)
Rebun (礼文郡)
Esashi (枝幸郡)
Monbetsu (紋別郡)
Tokoro (常呂郡)
Abashiri (網走郡)
Shari (斜里郡)

Notes

References
 Nussbaum, Louis-Frédéric and Käthe Roth. (2005).  Japan encyclopedia. Cambridge: Harvard University Press. ;  OCLC 58053128

1869 establishments in Japan
1882 disestablishments in Japan
Former provinces of Japan